The James E. Lindsay House is a historic building located on the east side of Davenport, Iowa, United States. It has been listed on the National Register of Historic Places since 1984.

James E. Lindsay

James Lindsay was a native of Essex County, New York and grew up working in his father's lumber mill. In 1856 he moved and purchased land in Wisconsin. He moved to Davenport in 1861 where his Wisconsin timber was rafted down the Mississippi River and sawed into lumber. He went into business with John B. Phelps. The two bought a mill on the east side of Davenport, which they named the Lindsay & Phelps, Co. His interests in lumber eventually led him to ventures in Arkansas, Minnesota, Washington State, Oregon, and Louisiana. In some of these ventures he joined with Frederick Weyerhaeuser from Rock Island, Illinois. In 1858 he married Mary Helen Phelps and they raised three children.

Lindsay built this home for his family in 1876. W.T. Waterman acquired the house from Lindsay's estate in the early 20th century. He was an associate in the law firm Lane and Waterman, which his father C.M. Waterman was one of the founding partners.

Architecture
The Lindsay House is one of several Italianate style houses in the Fulton Addition. The two-story frame house is influenced by the Victorian styles of the era. It features an irregular roofscape, progressive setback of projecting masses, a bracketed cornice, window trim, double-door entry, and its original front porch.

References

External links

Houses completed in 1876
Italianate architecture in Iowa
Houses in Davenport, Iowa
Houses on the National Register of Historic Places in Iowa
National Register of Historic Places in Davenport, Iowa